James Ellis (27 May 1867 – 16 April 1939) was a Scottish footballer who played as an inside right for Mossend Swifts, Third Lanark and Leith Athletic.

Personal life
Ellis's brother Dave was also a footballer, and played alongside James at Mossend Swifts. As a result, some sources erroneously attributed a Scotland national team cap against Ireland to James, when in fact David was the player who appeared.

References

Sources

1867 births
1939 deaths
Scottish footballers
Association football inside forwards
Third Lanark A.C. players
Leith Athletic F.C. players
People from Bathgate
Footballers from West Lothian
Scottish Football League players
Scottish emigrants to Canada
Mossend Swifts F.C. players